Guam Community College (GCC) is a community college in Mangilao, Guam. It was officially created by Public Law 14–77 in 1977. This law created the college by consolidating several pre-existing programs from a variety of institutions, including the Adult Evening School of the Guam Department of Education, the Community Career College of the University of Guam, the Apprenticeship Training Program of the University of Guam, and other programs originally created by Guam's Department of Labor and the Guam Police Department.

The U.S. Census Bureau puts the community college into the University of Guam census-designated place.

History 
Guam Community College (GCC) was founded in 1977 for secondary or postsecondary students. At the time of the GCC's establishment, the programs of the Community Career College at the University of Guam were relocated to the newly established GCC in November 1977; making up a substantial portion of its original program offerings. The college plays an important role in the six island public high schools where it offers several significant education programs in Tourism, Marketing, AutoCad, Construction and many more. Mary A.Y. Okada is the current president and was appointed in 2007.

Awards

Distinguished Alumni Award 
This is a list of past GCC recipients of the Distinguished Alumni Award.
 2009 Mr. Phillip Ada, Ms. Mary English 
 2010 Mr. Jeffrey John Ibanez
 2011 Dr. Anita Borja Enriquez
 2012 Dr. Kimberly Bersamin 
 2013 Mr. Eduardo Ilao
 2014 Mr. Joseph Quitano 
 2015 Mr. Don Muna
 2016 Mr. Eduardo Dela Peña, Jr. 
 2017 Ms. Erika Sotto Cruz
 2018 Mr. Joseph J. Leon Guerrero
 2019 Ms. Agnes Q. Diaz

See also
 University of Guam

References

External links
 Official website

Community colleges in the United States
Public universities and colleges in Guam
Buildings and structures in Guam
Educational institutions established in 1977
Schools accredited by the Western Association of Schools and Colleges
1977 establishments in Guam